Yahya bin Ahmad Sirhindi (nisba of Sirhind) was a 15th century Indian Muslim historian who wrote Tarikh-i-Mubarak Shahi, a Persian language chronicle of the Delhi Sultanate. Written during the reign of Mubarak Shah, his work is an important source of information for the Sayyid dynasty.

Tarikh-i-Mubarak Shahi 

Yahya expected to become a courtier of Mubarak Shah (r. 1431-1434), a ruler of the Delhi Sultanate. Therefore, he wrote Tarikh-i-Mubarak Shahi and presented it to the Sultan, hoping to win the royal patronage.

The book begins with the conquests of Muhammad of Ghor (1149-1206), and ends abruptly in 1434. Several earlier royal chroniclers had written texts describing the 13th-15th century history of the Delhi Sultanate. For example, Minhaj-i-Siraj covered the period up to 1259 in his Tabaqat-i Nasiri, Ziauddin Barani covered 1259-1356, and Shams-i Siraj Afif covered 1356-1388. Yahya carried forward this chronology all the way to 1434.

For the events up to 1351, Yahya selectively borrowed from the earlier writers, and arranged the material in a chronological order. For the events after 1351, he relied on personal memory and observations, besides the accounts of some trustworthy narrators. His work is a regional history, generally limited to military and political events. For example, Yahya omitted the economic reforms of Alauddin Khalji (r. 1296-1316).

References

Bibliography 

 
 
 

15th-century Indian historians
Delhi Sultanate
15th-century Indian Muslims
15th-century Persian-language writers
Indian male writers
Writers from Delhi
Year of birth uncertain
Year of death uncertain
People from Fatehgarh Sahib district